The Albania women's national under-19 football team represents Albania in international women's football and is governed by Albanian Football Association.

Fixtures and Results

2016 UEFA Women's Under-19 Championship Qualification

Group 11

2017 UEFA Women's Under-19 Championship Qualification

Group 4

Squad

Current squad
The following players have been called up to participate in an international friendly on March 1, 2017 versus Montenegro.
Caps and goals as of 3d March 2017

Recent Call-Ups
The following players have been called up within the last 12 months.

References

Under-19
Women's national under-19 association football teams
European women's national under-19 association football teams
Youth football in Albania